The South Jordan Canal is an historic waterway in Salt Lake County, Utah, United States.

Description
The canal was completed in 1876. The canal took water out of the Jordan River in Bluffdale and for the first time brought it above the river bluffs in what is now South Jordan.  As a result of the new canal, most of the families settled among the bluffs moved up away from the river onto the "flats" above the river which they could now irrigate.

The Canal remains in operation to this day by the South Jordan Canal Company. The President is Gary Cannon.

References

External links

Buildings and structures in Salt Lake County, Utah
Canals in Utah
Transportation in Salt Lake County, Utah
Canals opened in 1876
Buildings and structures in South Jordan, Utah